The Sun Comes Out World Tour (also known as the Sale el Sol World Tour) was the fifth concert tour by Colombian singer and songwriter Shakira, launched in support of her eighth and ninth studio albums, She Wolf (2009) and Sale El Sol (2010). After a special tour preview show held in Montreal, Canada, on 15 September 2010, the North American leg of the tour commenced at Uncasville, Connecticut, on 17 September, and closed at Rosemont, Illinois, on 29 October 2010. The European leg of the tour was planned to commence at Lyon, France, on 16 November, and end in London, England, on 20 December 2010. The tickets for the initial dates of the European leg were soon sold out, and Shakira extended the tour into 2011, beginning by announcing a show at Paris, France; venues at countries such as Croatia, Russia, Spain and Switzerland were soon added. The Latin American leg of the tour was a part of the Pop Festival and visited countries like Paraguay, Argentina, Brazil, Colombia, Mexico and Bolivia were added to the tour dates. The tour concluded in José Miguel Agrelot Coliseum in San Juan, Puerto Rico on 15 October 2011.

The setlist of the tour was composed of songs taken primarily from Shakira's ninth studio album Sale el Sol; the rest were from her previous studio albums. The stage was shaped like the letter "T" to enable a maximum number of viewers to see Shakira easily. A large screen was set behind the stage, on which various visuals were displayed. For the performances, Shakira mainly wore a mesh gold crop top coupled with skin-tight leather pants. Other attires Shakira wore during the concert shows included a hooded pink gown, a flamenco-skirt, and a feathery blue dress.

The concert shows were well received by critics, many of whom praised the charisma Shakira displayed during the performances. Commercially, the tour was a success. It ranked at number 40 on Pollstar's 2010 year-end "Top 50 North American Tours" list as it grossed a total of $16.9 million in the continent, with total ticket sales numbering 205,371. In 2011, the tour ranked at number 20 on Pollstar's 2011 "Top 25 Worldwide Tours" with a total gross of $53.2 million and ticket sales numbering 629,064. It brings a total of $70.1 million gross and 834,435 tickets sold, not including the European 2010 shows. A live album of the show held at the Palais Omnisports de Paris-Bercy in Paris, France in June 2011, was released as Shakira: Live from Paris, on 5 December 2011.

Background 

On 3 May 2010, Shakira's official website announced dates for the North American leg of the then-unnamed global tour. Three dates and locations were confirmed in the announcement: the tour would appear in Madison Square Garden in New York City, on 21 September, Toyota Center in Houston, on 8 October, and Staples Center in Los Angeles, on 23 October. Following a pre-sale period, the tickets for the three locations were made available for public purchase on 7 May, on Shakira's official website. By 23 August, 19 new tour dates and locations were added to the initial ones, summing the total count of the 2010 North American shows to 22. It was also announced that a special tour preview show would be held in Montreal, Quebec, Canada, on 15 September, to offer fans "an exclusive look at Shakira's worldwide arena tour", prior to the tour's official commencement in Uncasville, Connecticut, on 17 September. The last location for the tour to touch upon was Rosemont, Illinois, on 29 October.

On 28 June, Shakira announced the dates for the European leg of the tour. 22 dates and locations were announced in total and the tour would begin at the Halle Tony Garnier concert hall in Lyon, on 16 November, and end at the O2 Arena in London, on 20 December. Notable locations the tour would appear in were the Palais Omnisports de Paris-Bercy in Paris, the Festhalle Frankfurt in Frankfurt, the Manchester Arena in Manchester and The O2 in Dublin. After the tickets of the European leg of the tour were sold-out, Shakira extended the tour into 2011 and announced a show to be held at the Palais Omnisports de Paris-Bercy in Paris, on 14 June. Later, Shakira decided to add another date to the Paris show of the tour and set 13 June to perform at the Palais Omnisports de Paris-Bercy. By 15 March, new tour dates were added at locations such as Croatia, Russia, Spain and Switzerland.

On 3 December, the Latin America dates of the tour were announced. The first date of the tour was decided to be held on 1 March in Salta, Argentina. Other locations the tour would touch upon included Bogotá, in Shakira's native country Colombia, San José, in Costa Rica, Mexico City, in Mexico, and São Paulo, in Brazil. The final date for the Latin American leg of the tour was scheduled to be held on 12 April, in Panama.

The name of the tour was initially speculated to be "Tour of Earthly Delights", until Shakira's official website revealed the poster of the tour on 8 September, which highlighted "The Sun Comes Out World Tour" as the name. The poster of the tour features Shakira jumping in the air wearing a golden bikini top coupled with golden pants, similar to the cover art of her 2010 single "Loca". The tour was launched to promote Shakira's eighth studio album She Wolf, which was released in October 2009, and her ninth studio album Sale el Sol, which was set to release on 19 October 2010. The words "Sale el Sol" are Spanish for "The Sun Comes Out", hence the tour was also referred to as the Sale el Sol World Tour.

Development 

In 2008, Shakira signed a 10-year deal with international touring giant Live Nation, which prompted Forbes to deem her as the fourth highest earning female musician in history. The Sun Comes Out World Tour was her first tour to be promoted by Live Nation. The Latin American leg of the tour was part of Pop Festival, a "brand new festival that will bring international music stars to Latin America, and which will also showcase the latest in contemporary art and technology". According to Valentina España, senior managing editor of Terra.com, the production budget of the tour was big enough to "put Britney's Circus (Tour) to shame". Shakira talked about the tour, saying:

"It's going to have themes and there'll be a lot of audience interaction. My live show will have a lot of that — a lot of dancing, a joie de vivre. I feel such freedom on stage. It's such a rush to be performing. I like to see everybody's faces on stage, to see the reaction. Normally, you can only see the front row because of the lights. So you'll see a lot of (my) energy... but there are also going to be other moments that I hope are artistically energetic. I want people to feel things up close"

On 27 November 2009, it was revealed that Shakira was conducting auditions to choose a different opening act for each of the tour's appearances in different cities. The acts willing to audition were required to upload videos of their performances to Shakira's official website. Fans were allowed to vote for their favourite acts and the ones with the most would proceed to the finals; Shakira and her team would then pick the winner out of them. Sean Wolfington, Shakira's digital-business partner, talked about the decision and told the New York Post that "The artists will open for Shakira live in big cities and virtually through a video performance in smaller markets. There are a lot of talented artists, and Shakira wants to help them by giving them part of her stage". The visuals and conceptual video scenes for the tour were managed and designed by entertainment branding agency Loyalkaspar, who had previously designed tour visuals for artists like U2 and Jay-Z. Elliott Chaffer, the creative director of the agency, talked about the project, saying that "Shakira was a much bigger undertaking then anything we've attempted previously. They were looking for original content that had to work over two LED screens and on a huge projector mapping surreal models of an ever-changing animated face, all in just three weeks. This is for her global world tour, so modifications to the setlist and track durations continued through nine rounds of revisions". The visuals were projected onto the large screen set behind the stage. The stage was shaped in the form of the letter "T" to enable a maximum number of viewers to see Shakira.

Concert synopsis 

The concert began with the lights dimming and a sole spotlight being focused on the crowd. The spotlight then followed Shakira as she entered the hall wearing a hooded fuchsia gown. Singing the "pensive" and "sentimental" ballad "Pienso En Tí" ("I Think of You"), she began walking towards the stage while shaking her fans' hands and hugging them. As soon as Shakira climbed the stage, she threw off the gown to reveal her main attire: a mesh gold crop top coupled with skin-tight leather pants. A more energetic routine followed as she "sprinted, jumped, and yodelled" across the stage while performing more guitar-oriented versions of "Why Wait" and "Te Dejo Madrid" ("I Leave You Madrid"). After stopping to play a harmonica solo, Shakira performed "Si Te Vas" ("If You Go") accompanied by "dense" musical instrumentation. This was followed by a more rock-tinged performance of "Whenever, Wherever", during which Shakira invited four female fans onto the stage and taught them how to belly dance.

The band moved to a small platform in the middle of the hall and Shakira came onto the stage after changing into a wine red-coloured flamenco skirt. A short set of acoustic songs followed, beginning with a cover of "Nothing Else Matters", a ballad by American heavy metal band Metallica. According to Jon Parales from The New York Times, the cover of the song "made it sound Andean, with six-beat drumming and the strumming of a ukulele-sized charango". The cover was blended straight into a performance of "Despedida" ("Farewell"), a song recorded by Shakira for the soundtrack of the 2007 film Love in the Time of Cholera, during which she "tested" her band drummer's musical skill by "incorporating him into her moves". "Gypsy" was performed with a "folk lilt" and Shakira's vocals were backed by "accordion, fiddles and the rhythm section". The segment was closed with a performance of "La Tortura" ("Torture").

The mariachi-influenced "Ciega, Sordomuda" ("Blind, Deaf, and Dumb") was performed using a Stroh violin, which was used to replace the horn sections of the original recording. David Hardwick from SpinningPlatters.com said the use of the instrument was "impressive". She then sang the power ballad "Underneath Your Clothes". A large animated face resembling that of Residente, the lead singer of Puerto Rican band Calle 13, was projected onto the screen behind the stage during the performance of "Gordita" ("Chubby"), a hip hop and rap track in which the artist was featured. The face was used to cover Residente's portions of the song through prerecorded vocals. Shakira then sang the "Sale el Sol," a song which was originally said to be dedicated to Argentine musician Gustavo Cerati, Shakira's close friend and frequent collaborator, who had been in a coma. Shakira then changed into a pair of neon leopard-print pants and performed "Loca" ("Crazy") with more "intricate and urban choreographies". Shakira then let out a long howl, signaling the start of the performance of "She Wolf". The performances of "Loca" and "She Wolf" marked the first time back-up dancers were featured in the show. Dave Simpson from The Guardian commented that Shakira was "howling like a banshee" during the performance. The performance of the Middle Eastern music-flavoured "Ojos Así" ("Eyes Like Yours") was the final one on the setlist of the concert. Shakira incorporated belly dancing steps into her choreography during the performance.

The encore segment of the concert began with a performance of "Antes de las Seis" ("Before Six O'clock"), during which artificial snow was launched into the air as the song neared its end. The keyboardist of the concert band impersonated Haitian-American rapper Wyclef Jean, the featured artist on Shakira's hit single "Hips Don't Lie" during the performance of the song. The concert show ended with the performance of  "Waka Waka (This Time for Africa)", the worldwide hit Shakira recorded as the official anthem song of the 2010 FIFA World Cup, during which she again invited fans onto the stage to dance with her as confetti "filled the entire arena".

Critical response 

The tour received numerous positive reviews from critics. Terry Mathews from The Sulphur Springs News-Telegram, in his review of the concert held at the American Airlines Center in Dallas, opined that the show was "equally enormous and bombastic as it was intimate" and that there was a "joyful atmosphere after the show", which proved that Shakira "had done her job". However, she also felt that the "fast paced, familiar tracks" of She Wolf should have been included more on the setlist rather than the "still unknown singles" of Sale el Sol. Mikael Wood from the Los Angeles Times, in his review of the concert held at the Staples Center in Los Angeles, also complimented Shakira's charisma and praised her for not going over the top, instead noting that she was "carrying out a plan, skillfully and with no shortage of superstar charisma". Dakin Hardwick from SpinningPlatters.com, in his review of the concert held at the Oracle Arena in Oakland, praised Shakira's interaction with the fans and called her "truly one of the great performers", commenting that "the woman simply will not stop dancing". Jim Farber from New York Daily News, in his review of the concert held at Madison Square Garden in New York, felt that Shakira's voice lacked sensuality and that it "displayed a clucky, burpy style". However, he also said that her energetic live performance and ability to dance "smoothed out her rougher elements", and that she "whipped up the kind of charisma that doesn't need to come from any particular place to charm". Jon Pareles from The New York Times, in his review of the concert held at Madison Square Garden in New York, praised Shakira's multi-cultural approach during the show and called it "globalization" with "pure positive thinking" and Shakira a "star with a conscience". Mick Stingley from The Hollywood Reporter, in his review of the concert held at Madison Square Garden in New York, said that the show "cemented Shakira's place as an arena-rock star", and concluded that the concert was an "effervescent message of love from a world music diva with dance fever".

Tim Burrows from The Telegraph, in his review of the concert held at the O2 Arena in London, complimented Shakira's charisma during the show and her ability to make sure that the "crowd still left glowing", saying that it was the product of a "masterclass in cold calculation". Dave Simpson from The Guardian, in his review of the concert held at the Manchester Arena in Manchester, favoured Shakira's charisma and bold sexuality, noting that it is "upfront and yet nowhere near as overt as a Christina Aguilera or Madonna". He described Shakira's approach towards the performances during the show, saying that she "gives everything to the performance while revealing nothing", and that she appears to be "simultaneously like a hyperintelligent pop mastermind and an overawed little girl having tremendous fun".

Commercial reception 

During its North American appearances spanning from 21 September to 23 October 2010, the tour grossed $3,685,377, and ranked at number four on Billboard Hot Tours chart on 11 November 2010. The shows at Madison Square Garden in New York and Staples Center in Los Angeles were sold out. Pop Festival, the sponsor of the Latin American leg of the tour, grossed $13,516,890 during the dates spanning from 12 to 27 March 2011, and ranked at number two on the Billboard Hot Tours chart on 8 April 2011. According to Spanish automobile manufacturer SEAT, the sponsor of the European leg, the 21 venues the tour appeared at were all sold-out, and attended by an approximate total of 360,000 fans. It was one of the highest-grossing tours of the year 2010.

According to Pollstar, the tour grossed a total of $16.9 million during its North American dates, thus ranking at number 40 on Pollstar's 2010 year-end "Top 50 North American Tours" list. In North America, the tour sold an average of 9,335 tickets, and a total of 205,271 tickets. Its average gross was $768,182. Worldwide, the tour grossed a total of $39.9 million from 1 January 2011, to 30 June 2011 alone, and ranked at number 11 on Pollstar's "Top 50 Worldwide Tours" list, compiled on the basis of this period. It sold an average of 11,661 tickets, and a total of 524,723 tickets. Its average gross was $886,667 during this period. From 1 January 2011, to 31 December 2011, the tour grossed a total of $53.2 million, and ranked at number 20 on Pollstar's "Top 25 Worldwide Tours", compiled on the basis of this period. It sold an average of 13,106 tickets, and a total of 692,064 tickets. Its average gross was $1,108,333.
The show in Mérida in Mexico broke the attendance record where 170,000 people attended. The concert in Lebanon was attended by 28,000 people, breaking the all-time attendance record in the country.

Live recording 

The performances that took place at the Palais Omnisports de Paris-Bercy in Paris, France, on 13 and 14 June 2011, were recorded for inclusion in the live album of the tour. The live album was titled Live from Paris (En Vivo Desde París in Hispanic countries), and was released on 5 December 2011. It was made available in three formats: an exclusive edition which includes a DVD and live audio CD, a standard DVD edition, and a Blu-ray Disc edition. The debut of the live album was preceded by the release of "Je l'aime à mourir", Shakira's rendition of the original song written and performed by French singer-songwriter Francis Cabrel, on 29 November 2011. In France, Live from Paris was certified platinum in France by the Syndicat National de l'Édition Phonographique for sales of 100,000 units.

Opening acts 

Parade (United Kingdom)
Los Huayra (Argentina)
Vampire Weekend (Argentina)
Ziggy Marley (Argentina, Paraguay, Peru)
Vicentico (Argentina)
Los Auténticos Decadentes (Paraguay)
J Balvin (Colombia)
Bomba Estereo (Colombia)
Train (Colombia, Peru)
Belanova (Colombia and México)
 Ha*Ash (México)
Smiley (Romania)
Bosquito (Romania)
Emmanuel Horvilleur (Argentina)
Leo García (Argentina)

Set list 

The following set list is representative of the show on 21 September 2010.
 "Pienso en Ti"
 "Why Wait"
 "Te Dejo Madrid"
 "Si Te Vas"
 "Whenever, Wherever"
 "Inevitable"
 "El Nay A'Atini Nay" (Interlude)
 Medley: "Nothing Else Matters"/"Despedida"
 "Gypsy"
 "La Tortura"
 "Ciega, Sordomuda"
 "Underneath Your Clothes"
 "Gordita"
 "Sale el Sol"
 "Las de la Intuición"
 "Loca"
 "She Wolf"
 "Ojos Así"
 "Antes de las Seis"
 "Hips Don't Lie"
 "Waka Waka (This Time for Africa)"

Tour dates

Cancelled shows

Personnel 
Credits for the tour adapted from the liner notes of Live from Paris DVD, and AllMusic.

Promoter — Live Nation
Live Nation SVP of Touring — Jorge "Pepo" Ferradas
Live Nation Tour Director — John Sanders
Tour Director — Marty Hom
Production Supervisor — Jake Berry
Tour Accountant — Dan McGee
Production Co-ordinator — Ali Vatter
Management — Nexus Management Group
Road Manager — Rome Reddick
Head Rigger — Russell Glen
Rigger — Bjorn Melchert
Head Carpenter — Pat Boyd
Show Director — Felix Barrett
Tour Camera Operations — Redo Jackson, Joe Walohan
Cameras Supervisor — Brett Turnbull
Camera Operations — Adam Gohil, Julian Harries, Matt Ingham, Alistair Miller, Lotte Ockeloen, Harriet Sheard, Niels Van Brakel, Tim Van Der Voort, Alan Wells, Nick Wheeler, Shaun Willis
Projectionist — David Cruz
Wardrobe Supervisor — Louise Kennedy
Choreographer — Maite Marcos
Tour Photographer — Xavi Menos
Tour Assistant — Brad Kline
Music Supervisor — Magnus Fiennes
Musical Production — Shakira, Tim Mitchell
Show Programmer — Freddy Pinero
Audio Crew Chief — Simon Bauer
Audio Monitor Technician — Chris King
Audio Technicians — William Fisher, Dustin Lewis
Monitor Engineer — Ed Dragoules
Key Follow Spot Operator — Linford Hudson
Carpenters — Eric Duheaney, Brittany Kiefer
Lighting Director(s) – Fraser Elisha, Daniel O'Brien
Lighting Designer — Paul Normandale
Lighting Technicians — Martin Garnish, Kris Lundberg, Ben Rogerson, Chris Roper
Lighting Crew Chief — Joe Gonzales
Lighting Programmer — John McGarrigle
Spot Lights Technician — Fraser McFarlane
Satge Manager — Shawn Saucier
Floor Manager — Roger Dempster
Set Designer — Es Devlin
Tour Security — Armando Vera
Venue Security — Joaquin Barcia
Artist Personal Security — Antonio Merabak
Production Manager — Bill Leabody
Advance Production Manager — Phay MacMahon
Dressing Rooms — Brad Kline
Front of House Engineer — Michael Keating
Artist Dresser — Louise Kennedy
Wardrobe — Pam Lewis
Makeup — Elaine Kennedy, Lorraine Milligan, Elizabeth Patey
Hair Stylists — Cynthia Alvarez, Luz Marina Gonzalez
Musical Director — Tim Mitchell
Drums — Brendan Buckley
Keys — Albert Menendez
Guitar Technician — Andy Corns, Sean "Stig" Tighe
Guitar(s) – Tim Mitchell, Grecco Buratto
Bass guitar — Eric Holden
Backing vocals — Olgui Chirino
Percussion — Thomas "Dyani" Akuru
Violin Technician — Sean "Sting" Tighe
Violin — Una Palliser
Dancers — Dionne Renee, Yanet Fuentes
Shakira's Assistant — Gabriela Diaz
Video Blogs — Xavi Menos
Video Director — Michael Tinsley
Video Engineer — Michael Bischof
Lead LED Technician — Phil Evans
Additional TV Lighting — Phase 4
VIP Sponsorship Co-ordinator — Elizabeth Curto
DVD Technical Facilities — CINEVIDEOGROUP, The Netherlands
Unit Manager — Bolke Burnaby Lautier
CINEVIDEOGROUP Project Co-ordinator — Rogier Kalkhove

References

External links 

Shakira concert tours
2010 concert tours
2011 concert tours